Milett Figueroa (born 10 June 1992) is a Peruvian model, celebrity at El Gran Show and beauty pageant titleholder who was crowned Miss Supertalent 2017 on December 3, 2016, in Seoul, South Korea. She is the first Miss Supertalent winner from Peru.

Pageantry

Miss Supertalent 2017
In November 2016, she traveled to Seoul, South Korea, to represent her country as "Miss Peru" at the Miss Supertalent 2016 and won the title of Miss Supertalent 2016

References

External links 

 Official Miss Supertalent Official Website

1992 births
Peruvian beauty pageant winners
Peruvian female models
Living people
People from Lima